
Year 12 BC was either a common year starting on Saturday, Sunday or Monday or a leap year starting on Sunday (link will display the full calendar) of the Julian calendar (the sources differ, see leap year error for further information) and a common year starting on Friday of the Proleptic Julian calendar. At the time, it was known as the Year of the Consulship of Messalla and Quirinius (or, less frequently, year 742 Ab urbe condita). The denomination 12 BC for this year has been used since the early medieval period, when the Anno Domini calendar era became the prevalent method in Europe for naming years.

Events 
 By place 

 Roman Empire 
 Marcus Valerius Messalla Appianus and Publius Sulpicius Quirinius are Roman consuls.
 Tiberius Claudius Nero summoned to Pannonia due to severe revolt by the Delmataeians.
 Roman armies based at Xanten, Cologne and Mainz campaign beyond the Rhine.
 First official mention of Argentoratum, the city known in modern times as Strasbourg.
 Emperor Augustus is given the title Pontifex Maximus.
 Approximate date – Pyramid of Cestius erected in Rome.

 India 
 King Azes II dies. The rule of the Indo-Scythians crumbles as the Kushans, one of the five tribes of the Yuezhi who live in Bactria expand into India to create a Kushan Empire.

 By topic 

 Astronomy 
 Comet Halley makes an appearance.

Births 
 Agrippa Postumus, son of Julia the Elder and grandson of Augustus (d. AD 14)

Deaths 
 Gaius Caninius Rebilus, Roman senator and suffect consul
 Marcus Valerius Messalla Appianus, Roman consul (b. c. 45 BC)
 Marcus Vipsanius Agrippa, Roman statesman (b. c. 63 BC)
 Mithridates III, king of Commagene (Armenia)
 Sextius Propertius, Roman Latin poet and writer (b. c. 50–45 BC)

References